Ibinabo Fiberesima (born ) is a Nigerian film actress, ex-beauty pageant and event manager. She is a former president of the Actors Guild of Nigeria.

Early life and education
Born to a Nigerian father and an Irish mother, Ibinabo began her education when she enrolled as a student at the Y.M.C.A Play Centre, Port Harcourt before she proceeded with her secondary school education at Federal Government Girls College, New Bussa, Niger State. She holds a Bachelor of Arts certificate in English Language and Literature which she obtained from the University of Ibadan.

Ibinabo Fiberesima was born in Dublin, Ireland to Chief Dr. Dawaridabo Babatunde Fiberesima and Dr. Mrs. Bisola Fiberesima and hails from Okrika, Rivers State, Nigeria. She gained admission to the prestigious University of Ibadan where she earned a Bachelor of Arts Degree in English and Literature and then proceeded to earn a Masters Degree in Audio Visual Management from the Media Business School Ronda, Spain. She is an Actor, Director, Environmental Advocate and Event Planner.
Ibinabo Fiberesima started out as a model and ended that path with an enviable glut of modeling awards.  She was the 1st runner up, Miss Nigeria, 1991, and 2nd runner up at the Most Beautiful Girl in Nigeria (MBGN) beauty pageants. She was named Miss Wonderland in 1990, before delving into the movie industry making her debut in 1992 with the Action Thriller MOST WANTED to commence a career in acting.
Ibinabo Fiberesima went on to become the first female President of the Actors Guild of Nigeria, AGN, and has made her directorial debut with her two movies MIEBAKA and ALONG CAME A BUTTERFLY. She is currently a Brand Ambassador for Air Peace and Image Make-Up Nigeria.
She is also the National Director of Miss Earth Nigeria Beauty Pageant, which she has overseen since 2002.
She enjoys swimming, acting, reading, cooking, and traveling and is desirous of more trees and a better ecosystem.

Career

Pageantry
Ibinabo participated in the
1991 edition of the Miss Nigeria beauty pageant. She was named as the first runner-up to winner Bibiana Ohio. Before this, she had won the Miss Wonderland contest in 1990, and in that same year, was first runner-up at the Miss NUGA competition held at the University of Calabar.

In 1992, she competed in the Most Beautiful Girl in Nigeria (MBGN) pageant for the first time, where she placed as the second runner-up. In 1997, she competed and emerged first runner-up of the 1997 edition of Miss Nigeria before she went on to be crowned winner of Miss Wonderful that same year. She was also second runner-up for the Most Beautiful Girl in Nigeria in 1998.

Acting
Ibinabo made her debut as a film actress in the movie Most Wanted and has since gone on to star in several Nigerian films. she was one of the actresses' on Passion of Mary Slessor.

Controversy
In 2009, Ibinabo was charged with manslaughter and reckless driving after she accidentally killed a certain Giwa Suraj in 2006. On March 16, 2016, Ibinabo was sacked as President of the Actors Guild of Nigeria and sentenced to a 5-year jail term by a Federal High Court sitting in Lagos. She was however granted bail for ₦2 million and two sureties in like sum on April 7, 2016, by a Court of Appeal in Lagos pending the determination of her appeal at the Supreme Court.

Filmography

Most Wanted
The Ghost
St. Mary
The Twin Sword
Ladies Night
The Limit
Letters to a Stranger
'76
Rivers Between
A Night In The Philippines
Pastor's Wife
Camouflage "All My Heart''

References

External links

1973 births
Living people
Beauty pageant contestants from Rivers State
Actresses from Port Harcourt
Nigerian film actresses
20th-century Nigerian actresses
21st-century Nigerian actresses
Nigerian people of Irish descent
University of Ibadan alumni
Most Beautiful Girl in Nigeria contestants
Miss Nigeria delegates
Nigerian beauty pageant contestants